Survivor is a solo album by Eric Burdon released in 1977.

It was recorded at the Advision Studios in London, England. Burdon reunited with Zoot Money to write songs for this album. Also his old friend Alexis Korner helped recording.

Track listing
All songs written and composed by Eric Burdon and Zoot Money, except where noted.
 "Rocky" (4:00) 
 "Woman of the Rings" (4:17)
 "The Kid" (3:13)
 "Tomb of the Unknown Singer" (4:27) (Jonnie Barnett, Shel Silverstein)
 "Famous Flames" (4:16)
 "Hollywood Woman" (3:53) 
 "Hook of Holland" (4:31) 
 "I Was Born to Live The Blues" (3:55) (Brownie McGhee)
 "Highway Dealer" (3:26)
 "P.O. Box 500" (4:39)

Personnel
 Eric Burdon - lead vocals
 Zoot Money - keyboards
 John Bundrick - keyboards
 Jürgen Fritz - keyboards
 Alexis Korner - guitar
 Frank Diez - guitar
 Colin Pincott - guitar
 Geoff Whitehorn - guitar
 Ken Parry - guitar, vocals
 Dave Dover - bass guitar
 Steffi Stephan - bass guitar
 Alvin Taylor - drums
 Maggie Bell, P. P. Arnold, Vicki Brown - backing vocals

References

1977 albums
Eric Burdon albums
Albums produced by Chas Chandler
Punk rock albums by British artists
Hard rock albums by British artists
Polydor Records albums